Catto may refer to:

Places
 Cairn Catto, a prehistoric monument in Aberdeenshire, Scotland
 Catto, Switzerland, a village in the Swiss municipality of Quinto, Ticino

People
 Charles Catto (1934–2006), ice hockey director of player personnel and general manager
 Charles Gray Catto (1896–1972), American flying ace in World War I
 Edoardo Catto (1900–1963), Italian professional footballer
 Filipe Catto (born 1987), Brazilian singer, instrumentalist, composer, illustrator, and designer
 Graeme Catto (born 1945), Scottish doctor, president of the General Medical Council
 Harry Catto (1865–1912), American Negro league baseball outfielder
 Henry E. Catto Jr. (1930–2011), American businessman and ambassador
 Jamie Catto (born 1968), British singer/songwriter
 Jeremy Catto (1939–2018), British historian
 Malcolm Catto, English drummer and record producer
 Max Catto (1907–1992), English playwright and novelist
 Octavius Catto (1839–1871), American civil rights advocate and black baseball organizer
 Sally Catto, general manager for programming at the Canadian Broadcasting Corporation
 Stephen Catto, 2nd Baron Catto (1923–2001), British businessman
 Thomas Catto, 1st Baron Catto (1879–1959), Scottish businessman and Governor of the Bank of England
 William D. Catto, United States Marine Corps general

See also
 Cat
 Baron Catto
 Catt (disambiguation)
 Cato (disambiguation)
 Catton (disambiguation)
 Chatto (disambiguation)